Nicholas Pillai Pakiaranjith was a minority Sri Lankan Tamil, Roman Catholic parish priest and aid worker. He was killed on 26 September 2008 by a Deep Penetration Unit of the Sri Lankan Army.

Biography
Nicholas Pillai was born in Jaffna and joined the Mannar diocese and was ordained as a Jesuit priest on  December 17, 1997 .He was also the District Coordinator of Mannar for the Jesuit Refugee Service which helped and worked with war displaced Tamils. His death is part of a series of killing of Tamil human rights workers.

Incident 
Nicholas Pillai was on the way to provide aid to displaced Tamils when his van was hit by a claymore mine on Kalvi'laan on Maangkulam - Vellaangkulam road in Mannar while he was on his way to Vidaththaltheevu. He was killed while he was on his humanitarian mission.

See also
Mary Bastian
Chandra Fernando
George Jeyarajasingham

References 

Sri Lankan Tamil priests
Sri Lankan Tamil activists
Assassinated Sri Lankan activists
1967 births
2007 deaths
21st-century Sri Lankan Roman Catholic priests
21st-century Roman Catholic martyrs
People from Jaffna
20th-century Sri Lankan Roman Catholic priests